Army of Italy may refer to:
The Italian Army, the land forces of the military of Italy
Army of Italy (France), a field army of the French Revolutionary Army